The Adventures of Ellery Queen is a radio detective program in the United States. Several iterations of the program appeared on different networks, with the first one broadcast on CBS June 18, 1939, and the last on ABC May 27, 1948.

The Adventures of Ellery Queen grew out of the combined efforts of producer-director George Zachary and writers Frederic Dannay and Manfred Lee. Dannay and Lee, who were cousins, originated the Ellery Queen character. Initially they wrote the program's scripts, and Zachary handled production. Beginning in 1945, Anthony Boucher replaced Dannay and worked with Lee writing scripts.

During the program's first season, Radio Guide magazine called it "a CBS drama that will keep you on the edge of your chair." It added "You will find Ellery Queen both brave and brilliant and you will find yourself participating joyously in the ageless thrill of the manhunt."

Format
The Adventures of Ellery Queen invited a panel of armchair detectives to try to solve each case during its broadcast. Adapting a technique that had been used earlier in the Author! Author! radio program, when an episode's script reached a point at which all of the clues had been revealed, the scripted portion stopped, and the panel was challenged to identify the culprit.

Even with changes in networks, sponsors and stars, the basic format of the program remained constant throughout its time on the air. As listed on The Digital Deli Too website, the elements of each episode were as follows:The announcer would introduce the program and/or sponsor messages
The guest 'armchair detectives' would be introduced and the title of the night's mystery would be given.
The dramatized mystery would be presented to its conclusion.
The armchair detective(s) would make their case for the mystery's solution.
Ellery Queen would announce the actual resolution.
The announcer and Ellery Queen would provide the closing sponsor message, tease and announce the title of the next week's mystery, and close with the credits.

Listeners were encouraged to follow the clues, drawing their own conclusions, and match wits with the panel and the detective himself. Jim Harmon described the situation in his book, "The Great Radio Heroes": "Ellery Queen's show was the detective program that gave you, the listener, a chance to join in on the fun and games. You were given all the clues, and you could solve the mystery – if you happened to be a deductive genius on the level of Ellery Queen."

The guest panelists were usually wrong in their solutions; in the program's first four months, only one panelist was correct. Yet such appearances were quite popular with celebrities. Trade magazine Billboard reported in a 1942 article, "In some cases an agent's entire list of performers eventually ask to get on 'prestige' shows like Information Please as guest experts, on Ellery Queen as guest armchair detectives". The number of panelists over the show's life has been estimated at more than 750.

Characters and cast

Although the main characters in The Adventures of Ellery Queen remained consistent throughout its various incarnations on radio, the actors changed over the program's life. The primary characters and those who played each role were as follows:
Ellery Queen – The title character "was a private detective without official police affiliation who was often called into cases by his father, a police inspector." Dunning commented, "Queen was portrayed throughout as a modern-day Sherlock with a fine eye for clues." He was played by Hugh Marlowe (1939–1940), Carleton Young (1942–43), Sydney Smith (1943–44, 1945–47), Lawrence Dobkin (1947–48) and Howard Culver (1948). The program's producers made a conscious effort to create a certain mystique about the character of Ellery Queen by not identifying the actors who portrayed him. An article on The Digital Deli Too website reported: "Hugh Marlowe ... remained cleverly unidentified as the voice of Ellery Queen. That gambit continued for the remainder of the various runs of the canon irrespective of the network or sponsor."
Richard Queen – Ellery's father was a police inspector, played by Santos Ortega (1939–1947), Bill Smith (1947) and Herb Butterfield (1947–1948).
Nikki Porter – A character who had not appeared in the Ellery Queen written material, Porter was added to the program "[i]n order to provide the mandatory 'love interest' that was supposed to attract the female audience." Described as "his comely, copper-haired secretary," she was played by Marion Shockley (1939–1944), Barbara Terrell (1945), Gertrude Warner (1945–46), Charlotte Keane (1946–47), Virginia Gregg (1947) and Kaye Brinker (1948). Two of the actresses wed key men in the production of the program. Shockley and producer-director George Zachary were married in 1939, and Brinker married Queen's co-creator Manfred Lee in 1942. 
Sergeant Velie – Inspector Queen's assistant, described by one researcher as "doughty", apparently did not have a first name in the radio program. He was played by Howard Smith (1939), Ted de Corsia (1939–47), Ed Latimer (1947) and Alan Reed (1947).

Announcers were Ken Roberts (1939–40), Bert Parks (1940), Ernest Chappell (1942–44), Don Hancock (1947), Paul Masterson (1947), and Roger Krupp The musical directors were Lyn Murray and Charles Paul.

Broadcast history

Recognition
In 1946, The Adventures of Ellery Queen and Mr. and Mrs. North received the first Best Radio Drama Edgar Award awards from the Mystery Writers of America.

See also
Ellery Queen for information about the Ellery Queen character
Ellery Queen (TV series) for information about the 1975-76 NBC/Universal television series featuring the Ellery Queen character.

References

Notes

External links

Logs
Very detailed episodic log, listing episode number, guest armchair detectives, cast, synopsis of plot, and adaptations
Episodic log and much additional information about The Adventures of Ellery Queen
Episodic log for The Adventures of Ellery Queen from Jerry Haendiges Vintage Radio Logs

Streaming audio
 37 streaming episodes of The Adventures of Ellery Queen plus 31 streaming episodes of Ellery Queen's Minute Mysteries from Archive.org

Scripts
 Script for "The Adventure Of The Murdered Ship" episode of The Adventures of Ellery Queen
Scripts for episodes of "The Adventures of Ellery Queen" from Generic Radio Workshop Scripts

Short stories based on radio program
"The Man Who Wanted to Be Murdered" -- a short story in Radio and Television Mirror in which "Radio's famous ace detective meets his most fantastic case."
"The Adventure of the Haunted Cave" -- a short story in Radio and Television Mirror, "an Ellery Queen mystery with all the romance and chills of this famous detective's popular radio program"
"The Scorpion's Thumb," based on an Ellery Queen radio script, begins on page 26 in the December 1940 issue of Radio and Television Mirror.

CBS Radio programs
American radio dramas
1939 radio programme debuts
1948 radio programme endings
1930s American radio programs
1940s American radio programs
NBC radio programs
ABC radio programs
Detective radio shows
Radio programs adapted into television shows
Ellery Queen